Ardesman (also Romanized as Ardesmān) is a village in Rivand Rural District, in the Central District of Nishapur County, Razavi Khorasan Province, Iran. At the 2006 census, its population was 251, in 65 families.

See also 

 List of cities, towns and villages in Razavi Khorasan Province

References 

Populated places in Nishapur County